Isle Maree is an island in Loch Maree, Scotland.

It has the remains of a chapel, graveyard, holy well, and holy tree on it, believed to be the 8th-century hermitage of Saint Maol Rubha (d. 722), who founded the monastery of Applecross in 672. The island contains ancient stands of oak, holly and other trees not found on the other islands in the loch.  The waters of the loch were thought to have curative effects; as late as the 18th century, being towed round the island behind a boat was believed to be a cure for lunacy.  Two incised cross-slabs of probably 8th-century date are to be seen in the ancient graveyard.  Local tradition (still observed) asserts that nothing must ever be taken from the island, be it even a pebble from the shore, lest the insanity formerly 'cured' there return to the outside world.

In the 17th century, the Presbytery of Dingwall was disturbed by reports of several rituals, evidently of pagan origin, such as the sacrificing of bulls, on an island in Loch Maree. These revolved round a debased memory of Máelrubai, whose legacy had perhaps become mixed with an ancient pre-Christian cult of 'God Mourie'.  The island is near the north shore of the loch, and the adjacent shore is called in Gaelic Creag nan Tarbh, 'Cliff of the Bull', recalling these ancient rituals.

Wish tree 
On the island of St Maol Rubha or St Maree, in Loch Maree, Gairloch in the Highlands is an oak wish tree made famous by a visit in 1877 by Queen Victoria and its inclusion in her published diaries. The tree, and others surrounding it, are festooned with hammered-in coins.  The original tree, now much decayed, died many years ago because of copper poisoning.  It is near the healing well of St Maree,  to which votive offerings were made. Records show that bulls were sacrificed openly up until the 18th century

See also

 List of islands of Scotland

Footnotes

External links

Maree
Holy wells in Scotland